Mark David Bailey (born 26 November 1970) is a former New Zealand international cricketer who played in one One Day International for the New Zealand national cricket team.

Bailey was born at Hamilton in 1970. He played 89 first-class and 114 list A matches, mainly for Northern Districts in a career which lasted between 1989/90 and 2001/02. He made his New Zealand debut at the 1998 Commonwealth Games before playing his only One Day International during an ICC knockout tournament in Bangladesh.

References

External links

1970 births
Living people
New Zealand One Day International cricketers
New Zealand cricketers
Northern Districts cricketers
Cricketers at the 1998 Commonwealth Games
Commonwealth Games bronze medallists for New Zealand
Cricketers from Hamilton, New Zealand
Commonwealth Games medallists in cricket
20th-century New Zealand people
Medallists at the 1998 Commonwealth Games